Matic Skube (born February 23, 1988 in Kranj, SFR Yugoslavia) is a retired alpine skier from Slovenia. He competed for Slovenia at the 2010 Winter Olympics where he failed to finish the first run of the slalom.

At the World Junior Alpine Skiing Championships 2007, he won the gold medal in slalom. He won World Cup points seven times, last time on 15 March 2015 in Kranjska Gora with 27th place in slalom. His best result is 12th place, also in slalom, in 2011 in Adelboden.

He was included in Slovenian Men's team for the 2016–17 season, but on 4 June 2016 he announced his retirement from the sport.

References

External links
 
 
 

1988 births
Living people
Sportspeople from Kranj
Slovenian male alpine skiers
Olympic alpine skiers of Slovenia
Alpine skiers at the 2010 Winter Olympics
Universiade medalists in alpine skiing
Universiade silver medalists for Slovenia
Competitors at the 2007 Winter Universiade